Lyons Gray (born October 28, 1942) is an American businessman and politician.

Gray was born in Winston-Salem, North Carolina. He graduated from Wooster School in 1961 and from University of North Carolina in 1966. Gray also served in the United States Coast Guard in 1964 and 1965. Gray was involved in business. Gray served in the North Carolina House of Representatives from 1989 to 2003 and was a Republican. He was appointed to the seat after Ann Q. Duncan resigned in September 1989. Gray also worked for R.J. Reynolds Tobacco Company. He served as North Carolina Secretary of Revenue. Gray was the grandson of Bowman Gray Sr.

Recent electoral history

2000

References

External links

|-

1942 births
Living people
Bowman Gray family
People from Winston-Salem, North Carolina
Politicians from Winston-Salem, North Carolina
University of North Carolina alumni
Military personnel from North Carolina
Businesspeople from North Carolina
20th-century American politicians
21st-century American politicians
Republican Party members of the North Carolina House of Representatives
State cabinet secretaries of North Carolina